Edward Vernon Whiton (June 2, 1805 – April 12, 1859) was an American lawyer, jurist, and Wisconsin pioneer. He was the first elected Chief Justice of the Wisconsin Supreme Court.

Biography
Born in South Lee, Massachusetts, the son of General Joseph Whiton, who had served in the American Revolutionary War and the War of 1812.  Whiton moved to Janesville, in the Wisconsin Territory, in 1836, where he practiced law.

From 1838 to 1842, he served as a Representative to the Legislative Assembly of the Wisconsin Territory, and served as speaker for the 3rd Session of the 2nd Assembly (1840). From 1842 through 1846, he served in the Wisconsin Territorial Council (Upper House).

In 1847, Whiton was elected to the second Wisconsin Constitutional Convention. In the 1848 election in which Wisconsin voters ratified the new constitution, Whiton was also elected to become one of the first Wisconsin Circuit Court judges under the new constitution.  This also made Whiton a member of the first Supreme Court of Wisconsin, which was at that time composed of the state's elected Circuit Court Judges. On January 3, 1852, the circuit court judges together elected Judge Mortimer M. Jackson as the next chief justice, but when he declined the office, Whiton was chosen.

In 1852, the Wisconsin Legislature voted to create a new Supreme Court, distinct from the Circuit Courts.   Later that year, Whiton was elected the first chief justice of that newly formed Supreme Court, defeating Democrat Charles H. Larrabee. Whiton served as chief justice until his death in 1859, having been re-elected in 1857.

Supreme Court
In the "Booth cases" of 1854 (Ableman v. Booth) and 1855 (In Re: Booth and Ryecraft), Whiton issued significant opinions in favor of states' rights to nullification of federal laws.  The Booth cases centered on Milwaukee abolitionists Sherman Booth and John Ryecraft, who were charged under the Fugitive Slave Act of 1850 with aiding the escape of Joshua Glover to Canada.  Booth was arrested by U.S. Marshall Stephen Ableman, but sought a writ of habeas corpus from a Wisconsin court.  The court granted the writ, and Ableman appealed the ruling to the Wisconsin Supreme Court.  Whiton wrote in the majority, with Justice Abram D. Smith, that the Fugitive Slave Act was unconstitutional, and affirmed that Booth should be released.  The U.S. Supreme Court overruled the Wisconsin decision, asserting the supremacy clause and ruling that the power of the State of Wisconsin "is limited and restricted by the Constitution of the United States."  The Wisconsin Supreme Court refused to file the U.S. Court's mandate—and never has. The case significantly inflamed abolitionist passions in Wisconsin in the run-up to the American Civil War.  Booth was ultimately pardoned in the final days of the presidency of James Buchanan.

In the 1856 Bashford v. Barstow case, Whiton effectively decided the outcome of the 1855 Wisconsin gubernatorial election.  Initially, Democrat William A. Barstow, the incumbent Governor, appeared to be the winner by a mere 157 votes.  His opponent, Republican Coles Bashford challenged the result as fraudulent, an allegation which was borne out by the discovery of fabricated votes from non-existent precincts.  Barstow argued that as head of the executive branch, he had the authority to count the votes and certify the results, and that the legislative and judicial branches could not interfere.  The Court ruled that, according to the Wisconsin Constitution, it was the election, not the canvass, which determined the right to the office.  After the ruling, Barstow's militia, which had been prepared to enforce his election with violence, began to disperse.  Barstow relented, and Bashford was eventually allowed to take office as the 5th Governor of Wisconsin.  The case was an important precedent for the Supreme Court as the ultimate arbiter of the law in Wisconsin.

In 1859 his health began to fail.  He took a leave from the Court in the spring of 1859 and died at his home in Janesville on April 12, 1859.

Personal life and family

Whiton married Amoret Dimock in 1847.  They had four children together, but only one survived to adulthood.

References

People from Lee, Massachusetts
Politicians from Janesville, Wisconsin
Members of the Wisconsin Territorial Legislature
19th-century American politicians
Wisconsin state court judges
Chief Justices of the Wisconsin Supreme Court
1805 births
1859 deaths
19th-century American judges